The Gulf Breeze was a daily passenger train operated by Amtrak between New York City and Mobile, Alabama, as a section of the  Crescent. The two trains split in Birmingham, with the Gulf Breeze serving an additional seven stations in Alabama on a  route south to the Gulf Coast. Service ran from 1989 until 1995.

History 

Amtrak introduced the Gulf Breeze on October 27, 1989 as a section of the Crescent (New York City–New Orleans). Costs of operation were split between Amtrak and the state, with the latter contributing about $1.3 million per year. Annual ridership in FY 1994, the last full year of operation, was 7,737. In December 1994 Amtrak announced that the Gulf Breeze would be discontinued as part of a broad cost-cutting measure which saw other services eliminated or reduced. The last Gulf Breeze ran on 1 April 1995, and was replaced by bus service.

Later that year attempts were made under the auspices of the Southern High Speed Rail Commission to resurrect the Gulf Breeze as a Mobile–New Orleans service, sharing part of the Sunset Limited'''s route. This was eventually realized as the Gulf Coast Limited, a joint effort between Alabama, Mississippi and Louisiana which operated 1996–1997.

 Route 
The Gulf Breeze split from the Crescent at Birmingham and ran south through Montgomery to Mobile on the Gulf of Mexico, while the Crescent continued southwest through Mississippi to New Orleans. At the time Mobile was served also by the Sunset Limited (Orlando, Florida–Los Angeles, California).

The Gulf Breeze served the following communities, in southbound order:
Birmingham, Alabama
Montgomery, Alabama
Greenville, Alabama
Evergreen, Alabama
Brewton, Alabama
Atmore, Alabama
Bay Minette, Alabama
Mobile, Alabama

Of these, Birmingham is still served by the Crescent, while Mobile and Atmore were served by the Sunset Limited'' prior to Hurricane Katrina, which saw the shortening of that line to New Orleans. The remainder no longer have passenger rail service.

References

External links 

 Southern High-Speed Rail Commission

Former Amtrak routes
Passenger rail transportation in Alabama
Railway services introduced in 1989
1995 disestablishments in the United States
Railway services discontinued in 1995
Former long distance Amtrak routes